Vanuatu has competed in ten of the twenty previous Commonwealth Games; starting at the Games in 1982. Vanuatu won its first medals at the 2018 games, when Friana Kwevira won bronze in the women's F46 javelin throw and when Miller Pata and Linline Matauatu won bronze in beach volleyball.

Medalists

See also
 All-time medal tally of Commonwealth Games

References

 
Vanuatu and the Commonwealth of Nations
Nations at the Commonwealth Games